The Acorn Online Media Set Top Box was produced by the Online Media division of Acorn Computers Ltd for the Cambridge Cable and Online Media Video on Demand trial and launched early 1996. Part of this trial involved a home-shopping system in partnership with Parcelforce.

The hardware was trialled by NatWest bank, as exhibited at the 1995 Acorn World trade show.

Specification

STB1

The STB1 was a customised Risc PC based system, with a Wild Vision Movie Magic expansion card in a podule slot, and a network card based on Asynchronous Transfer Mode.

Memory: 4 MiB RAM 
Processor: ARM 610 processor at 33 MHz; approx 28.7 MIPS
Operating system: RISC OS 3.50 held in 4 MiB ROM

STB20

The STB20 was a new PCB based around the ARM7500 System On Chip.

Memory: 
Processor: ARM7500 processor
Operating system: RISC OS 3.61, a version specific for this STB, held in 4 MiB ROM.

STB22

By this time Online Media had been restructured back into Acorn Computers, so the STB22 is branded as 'Acorn'.

Memory: 
Processor: 
Operating system: a development of RISC OS held in 4 MiB ROM

References

External links
The Full Acorn Machine List: STB

Computer-related introductions in 1996
Online Media Set Top Box
Legacy systems
Set-top box